The Journal of Non-Equilibrium Thermodynamics is a quarterly peer-reviewed scientific journal covering the field of non-equilibrium thermodynamics. It was established in 1976 by Jurgen Keller and its current editor-in-chief is Karl-Heinz Hoffmann (Chemnitz University of Technology).

Abstracting and indexing 
The journal is abstracted and indexed in:

According to the Journal Citation Reports, the journal has a 2020 impact factor of  3.328.

References

External links

De Gruyter academic journals
Quarterly journals
English-language journals
Publications established in 1976
Engineering journals
Physical chemistry journals
Thermodynamics